Eva Irene de los Ángeles García Fabre (born August 2, 1953), is an Ecuadorian businesswoman, diplomat, and politician, currently serving as her country's ambassador to Peru.

Biography
Eva García Fabre was born in Guayaquil on August 2, 1953. She graduated from the University of Guayaquil with a degree in economics, and completed a master's in international business and foreign trade.

In 2002, she was a candidate on the Democratic Left's presidential ticket, together with Rodrigo Borja.

In 2005, she became Ecuador's permanent representative to the World Trade Organization in Geneva.

In 2017, President Lenín Moreno appointed her . After Vice President Jorge Glas was sentenced to prison for his role in the Odebrecht scandal, Moreno delegated her the presidency of the Production Sector Council, which is in charge of regulating public policies for production and industry at the national level.

On August 23, 2018, Eva García Fabre resigned as minister.

President Moreno named her Ecuador's ambassador to Peru on March 8, 2019.

References

External links

 

1953 births
Ambassadors of Ecuador to Peru
Ecuadorian businesspeople
Government ministers of Ecuador
Living people
People from Guayaquil
Permanent Representatives to the World Trade Organization
University of Guayaquil alumni
Women government ministers of Ecuador
21st-century Ecuadorian women politicians
21st-century Ecuadorian politicians